The Lothian and Borders Battalion, Army Cadet Force (Lothian & Borders Btn, ACF) is a cadet battalion forming part of the Army Cadet Force operating within the Scottish Lowlands.  Since 2014, the county has been part of Headquarters Scotland and is currently divided into five companies and includes a regimental band and pipes and drums.

Background 
In 1863, along with the formation of the Volunteer Force, the first government sanctioned cadet groups were allowed to be formed.  These groups would mostly be formed in connection with existing volunteer companies and battalions.  Following the Territorial and Reserve Forces Act 1907 which organised the former Volunteer Force into a coherent organisation, known as the Territorial Force (TF), the cadets were expanded.  Each company consisted of no less than 30 cadets, and four of these companies formed a "Cadet Battalion", the predecessors to the modern "Cadet County".

Unlike their modern successors, the first cadet battalions were administered by their local County Territorial Force Associations, and rarely ever came under an "army command".  However, following changes to the organisation of the Cadets, in 1923 all cadet forces were taken under complete control of the County Associations.

Following the Options for Change announced following the Dissolution of the Soviet Union and subsequent End of the Cold War, the Lothian Battalion and King's Own Scottish Borders Battalions of the Army Cadet Force were merged into the new Lothian and Borders Battalion, Army Cadet Force.  The first mention of the battalion was for a Second Lieutenant on probation appointed to be Lieutenant in the battalion from 23 November 1996.  This battalion however had been formed in 1992.

In 2013, the battalion was reorganised from six companies (lettered A-F) into four companies named after battle honours of the Royal Scots Borderers.  Following this reorganisation, the battalion's structure was revamped and the below structure is that of 2021 after the reforms.

As of December 2021, each Army Cadet Force county reports to their local brigade deputy commander, or in the case of independent regional headquarters the commander.  However, for administrative duties each cadet county reports to Commander Cadets, who is a senior 1* Brigadier part of Headquarters, Regional Command.

Organisation 
As of January 2022, the Lothian and Borders Battalion ACF consists of appx. 600 cadets and 150 adult volunteers in 34 detachments spread throughout the Lothian and Borders areas.  Each Army Cadet Force 'county' is in-fact a battalion, and each 'detachment' is equivalent to that of a platoon.

Lord-Lieutenant's Cadets 

The Lord-Lieutenant's Cadet is seen as the aide and representative of the cadet forces to the British royal family and the Lord-lieutenant in an administrative county Scotland. Typically, one is chosen from each of the main cadet forces, the Army Cadet Force, Air Training Corps and Sea Cadets (United Kingdom). Occasionally, one may also be chosen from the Combined Cadet Force. They are selected each year at the Spring Lord-lieutenant's awards in each county.

They provide an essential link between the armed forces and the local community, assist with recruiting within the cadet forces and assist the county's Reserve Forces and Cadets Association. The cadet from each arm of the cadet forces is selected and appointed based on their outreach and participation within their squadron, detachment or unit, and is seen as one of the highest achievements in the Cadet Forces.

See also 

 List of Army Cadet Force units
 Combined Cadet Force

Footnotes

Notes

Citations

References 

 

Military units and formations established in 1992
1992 establishments in the United Kingdom
1992 establishments in Scotland
Army Cadet Force
Army Cadet Force counties